Gran Turismo 6 is a racing video game developed by Polyphony Digital and published by Sony Computer Entertainment for the PlayStation 3. It is the sixth major release and twelfth game overall in the Gran Turismo video game series. It was released worldwide on December 6, 2013. It was met with positive reception and was a financial success. New features included the addition of more cars and tracks, improvements to the car customisation options, and partnerships with the Goodwood Festival of Speed, the Ayrton Senna Institute, the FIA and NASCAR.

Gran Turismo 6 is the first game in history to feature officially FIA-certified content.

Development
In November 2011, the Gran Turismo series' creator, Kazunori Yamauchi, said that he and his team at Polyphony Digital were working on Gran Turismo 6. In March 2012, employees were seen on site at Mount Panorama in Bathurst, New South Wales, Australia, photographing and scanning the track. They revealed that Mount Panorama would be included in Gran Turismo 6, making it the first Australian race track to be featured in the series.

In February 2013, Sony Computer Entertainment Europe’s senior vice president Michael Denny claimed that Gran Turismo 6 would remain a PlayStation 3 title, despite the unveiling of the PlayStation 4.

Gran Turismo 6 was announced on May 15, 2013, when Sony Computer Entertainment Europe hosted a celebration of the 15th anniversary of Gran Turismo at Silverstone Circuit in the United Kingdom. Kazunori Yamauchi said at the official announcement that Gran Turismo 6 would feature 71 layouts of 33 tracks, 1200 cars, a more flexible rendering engine that features adaptive tessellation, and a more simplistic user interface with faster loading times. An early build of Gran Turismo 6's updated physics was shown to the public when GT Academy 2013 was released on the PlayStation Store on July 2 the same year.

The developers announced that the Goodwood Festival of Speed hill climb course would be included on the game. The 1.16 mile strip of road that runs through the grounds of the Earl of March's family home hosts the annual Festival of Speed, where a variety of cars from throughout motorsport and the automobile industry as a whole try to set the best time they can along the narrow course. This gave the game developers the idea to base a track here due to the wide variety of vehicles that use the hill climb in front of 185,000 spectators. Yamauchi said, "I have always been a huge admirer of the Festival of Speed and what Lord March has achieved, I love the incredible range of cars on display – from the priceless, rare and exotic, to the latest family hatchbacks and full on racing cars – I love the challenge of the Hill Climb and the rally stage. Goodwood represents every type of motoring and motor sport which very much mirrors what we aim to achieve with Gran Turismo and so it is very special that we have forged this partnership. There will be no better feedback than that provided by the Goodwood fans to tell me if we are heading in the right direction with Gran Turismo 6!" A demo of GT6 was made available at the Festival, which gave spectators a chance to challenge Nick Heidfeld's 41.6-second course record set in 1999 in a Formula 1 car.

At 2013 Gamescom in August, it was revealed that Brands Hatch would be coming to Gran Turismo, alongside the return of Apricot Hill Raceway, a fan-favourite fictional track that was absent in Gran Turismo 5. Cars such as the Pagani Huayra, Fisker Karma, Chevrolet Corvette Stingray C7 and BMW Z8 were announced, as well as the Aston Martin One-77, Audi R18, KTM X-Bow and the 1971 Lunar Roving Vehicle (from the Apollo 15 mission). Nissan’s DeltaWing was originally announced for the game, but was briefly removed due to possible licensing issues. this decision was reversed on December 2 with the car returning in its 2012 and 2013 guises, alongside the last-minute additions of the Honda NSX Concept (Which was available as both an Acura and a Honda) and the 2008 World Rally Championship cars from Gran Turismo 5.

The worldwide launch event was held in Spain at Ronda and the nearby Circuito Ascari in December 2013; the city named a street for series creator Yamauchi during the event in gratitude for the public exposure.

Polyphony helped design Toyota's FT-1 concept car by first modelling the car in Gran Turismo 5 and later in Gran Turismo 6. It helped the car designers see the car in motion and sell the concept to Toyota’s management. The car was released as a free download to Gran Turismo 6 alongside other Vision Gran Turismo cars on January 14.

F1 drivers Sebastian Vettel and Bruno Senna were both test drivers for the game.

The online servers for Gran Turismo 6 were active until March 28, 2018. All downloadable content and the digital versions of the game could not be purchased directly from Sony's PlayStation Store after this date.

Features

The game developers announced a long-term partnership with the Ayrton Senna Institute in October 2013, where a percentage of profits from the sale of the game went to the organization, which promoted and provided education to the impoverished communities in Brazil. A free update in May 2014 added a new feature called "Ayrton Senna Tribute", which followed the motor racing career of Ayrton Senna. The update also includes the iconic Lotus 97T, which Senna drove during the 1985 Formula One season.

The game has 30 tracks and 1,200 cars to choose from. Among the other circuits new to the series are Willow Springs International Motorsports Park, Ascari Race Resort, and ones based in a sports stadium, in addition to several ones based in the Matterhorn, including the one near Riffelsee.

As well as some tracks featuring variable weather and time of day, there is also a dynamic celestial sphere, so that stars in the night sky have accurate positions. With this, there is also a feature where players can drive at Hadley Rille on the moon with the Lunar Rover.

The Top Gear test track, which appeared in Gran Turismo 5, doesn't return in the game due to the show's partnership with the Forza Motorsport franchise for the Xbox consoles.

Vision Gran Turismo

To commemorate the 15th anniversary of the series, Gran Turismo 6 also features "Vision Gran Turismo" (name reused from early GT5 trailer), a special project featuring concept cars designed for the game by top automobile companies, as well as sportswear brands Air Jordan and Nike, and automobile designing companies such as Zagato.

Downloadable content
Though no downloadable content (DLC) packs have been released for sale, several free cars have been released after the launch of Gran Turismo 6 through updates. These include the BMW M4, the Toyota FT-1 concept, and Mario Andretti's 1948 Hudson stock car.

Course maker
On September 30, 2015, a level editor app titled Track Path Editor was released on Apple's App Store and Android's Google Play. Players can design tracks on the app and then upload them to download and play on the PlayStation 3. Death Valley is introduced as a new location to the game. The app supported kml and gpx files, photo/bitmap image importing, and GPS tracing of real-life driving routes. Imported tracks can be used in arcade mode races, time trials, and shared online. The app was an immediate hit with journalists. In the first 24 hours, over 5000 users of the Android store had downloaded the app, and had given it a rating of 4/5. A week later, the Android store had had 10,000 downloads.

The editor was taken off from App Store in the same time the servers went offline (see above).

Multiple screens
The game supports up to six different views that can be presented on six or more PS3 consoles. Two left views, two right views, server view (front with dials), and a front view without any dials all can be duplicated on an extra PS3 console if they are on the same LAN.

Reception

Critical
Gran Turismo 6 received "generally favorable" reviews, according to review aggregator Metacritic. It was mainly praised for its more open focus on realism and even bigger collection of cars, but criticism emphasized on lacking more improvement, bugs and glitches at launch, and a bigger focus on online play and microtransactions. Eurogamer praised the "vast, sprawling compendium of cars" and the "staggering tracklist", with GamesRadar praising the graphics and realism. Polygon liked the variety of gameplay, while IGN said it was "a marked improvement on GT5". Hardcore Gamer commented that it was "surprisingly addictive" with "huge lasting appeal", and "arguably remains the gold standard of the genre". When Destructoid made a head-to-head comparison with the next-generation title Forza 5, Gran Turismo came out on top by a wide margin. When USGamer carried out a similar 3-way test, they concluded that "I’ve had both these games for weeks, but it’s Gran Turismo 6 that’s keeping me up late at night. Much as I like Forza 5, Gran Turismo just has more going for it...  The way Gran Turismo articulates different car types and handling characteristics is phenomenal, and its sheer variety of cars, tracks, racing formats and minigame challenges makes it hugely entertaining to play".

Commercial
For the week of launch in Japan, after two days of sales, Gran Turismo 6 had 204,784 physical sales - the game in second place had 117,432 sales for the whole week. These sales helped almost to double the sales of the PS3 console compared to the previous week. Among the Famitsu 2013 Top 100, a listing of the top 100 Japanese retail software sales for the year of 2013 from data collected by Famitsu's parent company Enterbrain, the game ranked number 24, with 282,686 physical retail sales within Japan. The game was the bestseller in France, Germany, Norway, Finland and New Zealand, number 2 in Australia and Italy, number 3 in the UK, Sweden, Denmark and Greece, and number 4 in Spain and South Africa. It was the 42nd highest selling game of 2013 across all formats in the UK, with it also being the biggest selling single-format racing title of the year. The game initially fared less well in North America, just making the top ten. The game was still in the top ten of the European PSN download sales chart at the end of June 2015. The game remained in the European and North American charts top ten at the end of January 2015. On July 25, 2015, some 19 months after release, the game was still at 12 in the UK full-price sales chart, from August 2015 the game was instead eligible for the  UK budget sales chart, where it remained in the top 20, and continued to sell well until mid-January 2016. Gran Turismo 6 was the 7th best selling game of 2015 on the PlayStation Store. In December 2014, the game won the gold award for sales of half a million in Japan.

Celebrity endorsements
Four-time Formula One world champion Sebastian Vettel appears in the game, as well as Mario Andretti's 1948 Hudson Hornet. NASCAR champion Matt Kenseth drives one of the new cars to the game. The game also features replica helmets and coveralls worn by drivers such as Jeff Gordon, Tony Stewart, Ayrton Senna, Jimmie Johnson, Petter Solberg and Mikko Hirvonen. Jay Leno helped the producers to include his 1000-horsepower Oldsmobile Toronado in the game.

References

External links

2013 video games
Goodwood estate
Gran Turismo (series)
Kart racing video games
Multiplayer online games
Inactive multiplayer online games
NASCAR video games
Off-road racing video games
Rally racing video games
PlayStation 3 games
Cancelled PlayStation 4 games
Cancelled PlayStation Vita games
PlayStation 3-only games
Racing simulators
Split-screen multiplayer games
Video game sequels
Video games developed in Japan
Video games scored by Daiki Kasho
Video games scored by Keiji Inai
Video games set in Australia
Video games set in Austria
Video games set in Belgium
Video games set in California
Video games set in England
Video games set in Daytona Beach, Florida
Video games set in France
Video games set in Germany
Video games set in Indianapolis
Video games set in Italy
Video games set in Japan
Video games set in Kent
Video games set in London
Video games set in Monaco
Video games set in Rome
Video games set in Spain
Video games set in Switzerland
Video games set in Tokyo
Video games set on the Moon
Video games with downloadable content
Video games with user-generated gameplay content
Products and services discontinued in 2018